Payena is a genus of plants in the family Sapotaceae described as a genus in 1844.

Payena is native to Southeast Asia.

Species

References

 
Sapotaceae genera
Trees of Indo-China
Trees of Malesia
Taxonomy articles created by Polbot